Wraios is a monotypic genus of spiders in the family Nesticidae. It was first described in 2015 by Ballarin & Li. Its sole species, Wraios longiembolus, occurs in China.

References

Nesticidae
Monotypic Araneomorphae genera
Spiders of China